The Ministry of Buddha Sasana, Religious and Cultural Affairs is a cabinet ministry of the Government of Sri Lanka. It is responsible for oversight of the country's de facto state religion, Theravada Buddhism by:
General oversight and maintenance of the welfare of the nation's Buddhist clergy and places of worship
Oversight of Buddhist education in the country, including provision of information technology to temples
The development of temples as community centres with multiple services outside of matters spiritual
Maintenance of selected places of Buddhist worship as tourist sites, and maintenance of sites of Buddhist pilgrimage
 The propagation of Buddhism and Buddhist  philosophy
Maintaining the nature of the Buddhist state via necessary legislation

List of Ministers

Parties

See also
Buddhism in Sri Lanka
Religion in Sri Lanka

References

External links
 Government of Sri Lanka

Buddha Sasana, Religious and Cultural Affairs
Buddha Sasana, Religious and Cultural Affairs